Cnemaspis menikay is a species of diurnal gecko endemic to island of Sri Lanka.

References

Cnemaspis
Reptiles described in 2007
Reptiles of Sri Lanka
Endemic fauna of Sri Lanka